Patton Township is a township in Centre County, Pennsylvania, United States. It is part of the State College, Pennsylvania Metropolitan Statistical Area. The population was 15,801 at the 2020 census, which is a 3.2% increase from the 2010 census.

Patton Township is served by the Patton Township Police Department and Alpha Fire Company.  Alpha Fire Company maintains one of its two substations in Patton Township.

History
Patton Township was established in 1794 and named after Colonel John Patton, a revolutionary officer, who co-owned the Centre Furnace, along with Colonel Samuel Miles. The Peter Gray family and the Conrad Hartsock family were the earliest settlers to the area.  They came to the Half Moon Valley in 1788, from Frederick County, Maryland, and settled in what is now Patton Township.  The early days were strongly influenced by Methodism.  As soon as Peter Gray had a roof on his log cabin, he began Sunday School classes, and founded what is today Grays United Methodist Church. These settlers also made pilgrimages to church at Warriors Mark, a 12-mile distance, because that was the nearest regular preaching point in the valley. Iron mining was begun in the early days of Patton Township, affording supply of ore for Centre Furnace. Scotia mines are located in this township, which is still rich in iron ore.

Geography

Patton Township is bordered by Huston Township to the northwest, Benner Township to the northeast, College Township to the southeast, Ferguson Township to the south, and Halfmoon Township to the southwest.

Demographics
As of a 2015 census estimate, the township was 77.3% Non-Hispanic White, 9.3% Black or African American, 1.5% Native American Alaska Native, 9.7% Asian, 1.3% Some other race, and 3.8% were Two or More Races. Hispanics and Latinos (of any race) were 3.6% of the population. 

As of the census of 2000, there were 11,420 people, 4,791 households, and 2,472 families residing in the township.  The population density was 460.1 people per square mile (177.7/km2).  There were 4,974 housing units at an average density of 200.4/sq mi (77.4/km2).  The racial makeup of the township was 89.24% White, 3.55% African American, 0.13% Native American, 4.48% Asian, 0.06% Pacific Islander, 0.81% from other races, and 1.73% from two or more races. Hispanic or Latino of any race were 2.16% of the population.

There were 4,791 households, out of which 24.5% had children under the age of 18 living with them, 43.8% were married couples living together, 5.4% had a female householder with no husband present, and 48.4% were non-families. 28.1% of all households were made up of individuals, and 4.1% had someone living alone who was 65 years of age or older.  The average household size was 2.38 and the average family size was 2.93.

In the township the population was spread out, with 19.1% under the age of 18, 24.5% from 18 to 24, 30.8% from 25 to 44, 19.0% from 45 to 64, and 6.6% who were 65 years of age or older.  The median age was 28 years. For every 100 females there were 106.2 males.  For every 100 females age 18 and over, there were 104.7 males.

The median income for a household in the township was $41,993, and the median income for a family was $61,503. Males had a median income of $41,064 versus $27,284 for females. The per capita income for the township was $22,860.  About 3.9% of families and 18.1% of the population were below the poverty line, including 6.1% of those under age 18 and 1.9% of those age 65 or over.

References

External links

 Patton Township official website
Parks in Patton Township

Populated places established in 1788
Townships in Centre County, Pennsylvania
1788 establishments in Pennsylvania